Norman Armstrong Senibici Ligairi (born 29 January 1976 in Nadi) is a Fijian rugby union player who usually plays as a fullback. He represents Fiji at international level in both the 15-a-side and 7-a-side game. Ligairi is to date the only Fijian to have scored two tries against the All Blacks in a game.

Biography
The youngest son of Abundant Life Assemblies of God evangelist the late Rev, Epi Qaidamu Ligairi and grandnephew of coup security chief and former SAS officer Major Ilisoni Ligairi.

Career
Ligairi made his international debut in May 2000 against Tonga at Nukualofa, and went on to feature in four other internationals that season. In 2001 he was capped five times for Fiji, and following further Tests in June 2002 he toured the northern hemisphere in November and played in matches against Wales, Ireland and Scotland.

Following games against Argentina and Chile, Ligairi was included in the Fiji squad for the 2003 Rugby World Cup which was hosted by Australia. He scored two tries in the pool match against Japan.

Ligairi was capped twice the following year, and went on to play for the Pacific Islanders in the matches against Australia and South Africa. He was capped eight times in 2005, including touring in November. In 2006 he was a part of the Fiji sevens team which won bronze at the rugby event at the 2006 Commonwealth Games. He went on to feature in the inaugural Pacific 5 Nations for Fiji. He is currently playing for La Rochelle in the Pro D2 Competition.

He was Fiji's first choice fullback between 2000 and 2007 and he is third in Fiji's all time try scorers list with 18.

He is also the only Fijian ever to score 2 tries against New Zealand.

External links
 
 Fiji profile
  
 Brive profile 
 Pacific Islanders profile

1976 births
Fijian rugby union players
Living people
Rugby union fullbacks
Rugby union wings
CA Brive players
Fiji international rugby union players
Pacific Islanders rugby union players
Commonwealth Games bronze medallists for Fiji
Rugby sevens players at the 2006 Commonwealth Games
Male rugby sevens players
Stade Rochelais players
Fijian expatriate rugby union players
Expatriate rugby union players in Japan
Expatriate rugby union players in France
Fijian expatriate sportspeople in Japan
Fijian expatriate sportspeople in France
Fiji international rugby sevens players
Sportspeople from Nadi
I-Taukei Fijian people
Commonwealth Games medallists in rugby sevens
Commonwealth Games rugby sevens players of Fiji
Commonwealth Games silver medallists for Fiji
Rugby sevens players at the 2002 Commonwealth Games
Medallists at the 2002 Commonwealth Games
Medallists at the 2006 Commonwealth Games